The 2005–06 Hellenic Football League season was the 53rd in the history of the Hellenic Football League, a football competition in England.

Premier Division

Premier Division featured 19 clubs which competed in the division last season, along with three new clubs:
Abingdon Town, resigned from the Isthmian League
Kidlington, promoted from Division One West
Shrivenham, promoted from Division One West

Also, Carterton Town changed name to Carterton.

League table

Division One East

Division One East featured 16 clubs which competed in the division last season, along with two clubs:
Bicester Town, relegated from the Premier Division
Quarry Nomads, transferred from Division One West, who also changed name to Oxford Quarry Nomads

Also, Bisley Sports changed name to Bisley.

League table

Division One West

Division One West featured 14 clubs which competed in the division last season, along with five new clubs:
Cricklade Town, joined from the Wiltshire League
Letcombe, transferred from Division One East
Old Woodstock Town, transferred from Division One East
Pewsey Vale, relegated from the Premier Division
Wootton Bassett Town, relegated from the Premier Division

League table

References

External links
 Hellenic Football League

2005-06
9